Bangla Talkies is a 24-hour Bengali music channel launched in 2018.
 This Free-to-air channel broadcasts back-to-back 100% latest exclusive Bengali songs.

Programming
Bangla Hits

References

Bengali-language television channels in India
Television channels and stations established in 2018
Television stations in Kolkata
Music television channels in India